Paul Thorburn (born 24 November 1962 in Rheindahlen, West Germany) is a former Neath RFC and international Wales rugby union player who played at full back and also featured in the Welsh international team.

Thorburn was a prolific long-distance goal kicker. He holds the record for the longest successful kick in an international test match (although not the longest in Rugby Union as a whole). He gained the record during the 1986 Five Nations Championship at Cardiff Arms Park with a penalty kick measuring exactly 70 yards 8 and a half inches (64.2m) against Scotland.

Thorburn was also in the Wales squad for the 1987 Rugby World Cup, during which he scored a conversion that won Wales third place in the competition.

He retired from playing in 1991. He was tournament director for the World Cup in 1999 and also a former special projects manager for the Welsh Rugby Union.

In 2006 he joined Ospreys after leaving the Welsh Rugby Union, however he left the club in June 2010 to pursue other business interests.

References

1962 births
People educated at Hereford Cathedral School
People from Neath Port Talbot
Rugby union fullbacks
Welsh rugby union players
Wales international rugby union players
Wales rugby union captains
Neath RFC players
Ebbw Vale RFC players
Barbarian F.C. players
Living people
Alumni of Swansea University